The Institute of International Education (IIE) is a 501(c) organization which focuses on international student exchange and aid, foreign affairs, and international peace and security. IIE creates programs of study and training for students, educators and professionals from various sectors. The organization says its mission is to "build more peaceful and equitable societies by advancing scholarship, building economies and promoting access to opportunity".

History 
The institute was established in 1919 at the cessation of World War I. Nobel Peace Prize winners Nicholas Murray Butler, president of Columbia University, Elihu Root, former secretary of state, and Stephen Duggan, Sr., professor of political science at the College of the City of New York (and IIE's first president) formed the Institute of International Education with the idea that educational exchange would incite understanding between nations.

IIE president Stephen Duggan influenced the U.S. government to create a new category of non-immigrant student visas, bypassing post-war quotas set by the Immigration Act of 1921. In the 1930s, IIE began expanding its activities beyond Europe, opening the first exchanges with the Soviet Union and Latin America. Edna Duge was director of the IIE's Latin America department in the 1940s. After World War II, the institute facilitated the establishment of what is now NAFSA and the CIEE. In the 1940s, IIE aided more than 4,000 U.S. students to study and work on reconstruction projects at European universities devastated by the war.

By the 1950s the number of foreign students to the United States nearly doubled. As a result, the institute formed a network of U.S. offices to serve the growing number of students under its administration. IIE began producing an annual statistical analysis of the foreign student population in the United States and named the study, Open Doors. In the 1960s, the institute opened overseas offices in Asia, Africa and Latin America.

In 1979, the IIE joined the White House and USIA to develop the innovative Hubert H. Humphrey North-South Fellowships, which brings mid-career professionals in public service fields from developing countries and East Central Europe to the U.S. for a year of academic study and practical professional experience. The International Education Information Center opened at IIE's New York headquarters in the 1980s and new offices in Budapest and Hanoi were established in the 90s.

In 2008, IIE president Allan Goodman led the institute's first U.S. higher education delegation. Eleven delegates representing seven U.S. colleges and universities traveled to Southeast Asia to enhance and expand linkages with institutions in Thailand, Vietnam and Indonesia. IIE has since led U.S. higher education delegations to countries such as Brazil, China, Indonesia, India, Myanmar, and Russia with the aim of expanding educational ties with the United States. In the 2010s, the institute established the IIE Centers of Excellence and launched the Emergency Student Fund (ESF). In 2011, IIE hosted the first in a series of conferences in Iraq designed to engage key stakeholders in advancing higher education discussions and development efforts in Iraq.

In 2012, IIE began administering the government of Brazil's Scientific Mobility Program, which provides scholarships to Brazilian undergraduate students primarily in the science, technology, engineering and math (STEM) fields. IIE brought together delegates from 15 countries and the EU in Washington, DC, for the 2012 International Education Summit on the Occasion of the G8, to discuss national priorities and educational cooperation among nations.

IIE Global Network 

The Institute of International Education's Global Network is composed of 18 offices and affiliates, 600+ staff, and 1,600 higher education partners worldwide. 
Each office networks local colleges, universities, and NGOs to administer regional programs as well as ensure the goals of sponsors are fulfilled.
The IIE Headquarters are located in New York City; regional offices are located in Washington D.C., Chicago, Denver, Houston and San Francisco in the 
United States. International offices and affiliates are located in:

The Americas

Chicago

Denver

Houston

Mexico City

New York City

San Francisco

Washington, DC

Europe

Budapest

Kyiv

Moscow

Middle East and North Africa

Dubai

Cairo

Sub Saharan Africa

Addis Ababa

South and Central Asia

New Delhi

East Asia and the Pacific

Bangkok

Beijing

Dili

Hanoi

Hong Kong

Jakarta (Partner Office)

IIE also administers 14 Regional Educational Advising Coordinators who provide training, resources and mentoring to support the U.S. Department of State's 
network of EducationUSA advisers. Current REACs are located in the following cities around the world: Lima, Mexico City, Rio de Janeiro, 
Budapest, Kyiv, Bratislava, Amman, Accra, Johannesburg, Lahore, Delhi, Beijing, Tokyo and Kuala Lumpur.

Current programs and services 
The institute (IIE) governs more than 200+ programs serving more than 27,000 people from 185 nations each year. The focal point of the programs include: Fellowship and Scholarship Management, Higher Education Institutional Development, Emergency Student and Scholar Assistance, Leadership Development, and International Development.

The programs involve participation in the US and abroad.

Research and publications 
IIE conducts applied research and policy analysis in the field of international student mobility. Through research and program evaluations, IIE provides advising and counseling on international education and opportunities abroad. IIE's publications, reports and policy papers also provide resources for students and advisers, domestic and international governmental agencies, non-governmental organizations and foundations. Some of IIE's research projects include: Open Doors, Project Atlas and the Global Education Research Reports.

Revenue 
In the year of 2016, the institute's revenue totaled $592,227,753, with the assets of US$141,678,650 (2016).

Governance 

IIE is governed by a Board of Trustees with input from advisory bodies and executive staff. The current president and CEO is Allan E. Goodman.

Ratings 
In 2017, Charity Navigator gave the organization a score of 89.86.

Further reading

Notes

References

External links

Organizations established in 1919
Non-profit organizations based in New York City
Charities based in New York City
International educational organizations